Nader Afshar Alavinejad is a former Iranian football player. He played for the Iran national football team in the 1951 Asian Games and the 1958 Asian Games.

He previously played for the Docharkheh Savaran and Taj until 1952.

Honours
Iran
Asian Games Silver medal: 1951

References

External links

 Nader Afshar Alavinejad at TeamMelli.com

Iranian footballers
Esteghlal F.C. players
Living people
Asian Games silver medalists for Iran
Asian Games medalists in football
Footballers at the 1951 Asian Games
Footballers at the 1958 Asian Games
Medalists at the 1951 Asian Games
Association football defenders
Year of birth missing (living people)
Iran international footballers
20th-century Iranian people